Crepidotus epibryus, is a species of saprophytic fungi in the family Crepidotaceae.  It is commonly known as grass oysterling in the United Kingdom and is seen there in late summer and autumn.

Description
Cap: The cap (pileus) of C. epibryus is generally about 0.4 to 1.5cm in diameter and is convex kidney shaped fanned, coloured white or pale buff with upper tomentose (finely felted) surface.  

Gills: On the underside, the gills (lamellae) are crowded and are classified as free with no stipe to connect to. The colour of the gills depends on maturity ranging from white when young to pinkish brown as the spores mature.

Spores: The spore print is pale buff.  The ellipsoid-shaped basidiospore of C. epibryus are 7-9 by 3-3.5 µm in size.

Absent features- No stipe (stem) or annulus (ring).

Similar species
Crepidotus variabilis is typically larger, has a smoother cap surface and does not have an inrolled cap margin.

Distribution
Common to Britain and Ireland, also occurs in Europe and in North America.

References

Crepidotaceae